Sri Rahula College (Sinhala: ශ්‍රී රාහුල විද්‍යාලය) is a mixed National school located in Kandy, Sri Lanka founded by Buddhist Theosophical Society led by Colonel Henry Steel Olcott in 1890. It offers primary and secondary education for more than 2,000 students from grade 1 to 13.

History 
During the late nineteenth-century Sinhalese Buddhist revival, Buddhist Theosophical Society under the guidance of Colonel Henry Steel Olcott founded several Buddhist schools around the country to provide English education to Buddhist students who would otherwise have had to go to a missionary school in order to study English. Under that program, they founded a school, Kandy High School, on a piece of land at Katugasthota. The school opened with only sixteen students in 1890 with Niyangoda as the first principal of the school.

College houses 
There are four college houses named after four Sinhalese kings. Students compete against each other representing their respective houses to win the annual inter-house games. 
  House Vijaya (විජය නිවාසය), named after Prince Vijaya. 
  House Parakum (පැරකුම් නිවාසය), named after King Parakramabahu I.
  House Mahasen (මහසෙන් නිවාසය), named after King Mahasena.
 House Gemunu (ගැමුණු නිවාසය), named after King Dutugamunu.

Past principals 
 Cyril Wijerathne (1991–1999)
 R. M. M. Rathnayake (1999–2002)
 E. M. Abeysekera (2002–2007)
 A. C. C. Perera
 S. M. C. Weerakoon

Notable alumni 
 Wimalaratne Kumaragama - Sinhalese Poet
 Asela Gunaratne - Sri Lankan Test, ODI, T20 cricketer.
 Arthur U. Amarasena - Journalist, Film Producer, Teledrama Director, Script Writer.

References

External links 
Sri Rahula College Official Web

National schools in Sri Lanka
Buddhist schools in Sri Lanka
Schools in Kandy